John Rutherford Rutherford (1904–1957), born John Rutherford Chalmers, was a barrister and Conservative MP for Edmonton in London.

He was elected in the National Government landslide of 1931. He changed his surname to Rutherford in 1933, a condition for inheriting the estate of his grand-uncle, Sir John Rutherford, a brewer and race-horse owner. He lost his seat in 1935.

Notes 

1904 births
1957 deaths
Conservative Party (UK) MPs for English constituencies
English barristers
UK MPs 1931–1935
20th-century English lawyers